Ergodicity economics is an approach to economic theory which emphasizes the ergodicity question, namely whether expectation values of stochastic processes are equal to their time averages. This yields alternative solutions to classic problems in economics. In decision theory, problems traditionally addressed using expected-utility theory have alternative solutions within ergodicity economics. Ergodicity economics also provides insights into the dynamics of economic inequality and suggests a possible solution for the equity premium puzzle.

Background

Relation to ergodic theory 
Ergodic theory is a branch of mathematics which investigates the relationship between time averages and expected values (or, equivalently, ensemble averages) in dynamical systems. Ergodicity economics inherits from this branch the probing of this relationship in the context of stochastic processes used as economic models. Early economic theory was developed at a time when the expected value had been invented but its relationship with the time average had not been explored. The two mathematical objects were generally believed to be identical, which amounts to an implicit assumption of ergodicity.
Ergodicity economics explores what aspects of economics can be informed by avoiding this implicit assumption. A comprehensive Perspective piece appeared in Nature Physics in December 2019.

Critique of the expectation value 

Mean values and expectation values are used extensively in economic theory, most commonly as a summary statistic. One common critique of this practice is the sensitivity of mean values to outliers. Ergodicity economics focuses on a different critique and emphasizes the physical meaning of expectation values as  averages across a statistical ensemble of parallel systems. It insists on a physical justification when expectation values are used. In essence, at least one of two conditions must hold:

 the average value of an observable across many real systems is relevant to the problem, and the sample of systems is large enough to be well approximated by a statistical ensemble;
 the average value of an observable in one real system over long time is relevant to the problem, and the observable is well modelled as ergodic.

In ergodicity economics, expectation values are replaced, where necessary, by averages that account for the ergodicity or non-ergodicity of the observables involved.

Academic programs 
A dedicated ergodicity-economics research program was set up at the London Mathematical Laboratory in 2012. In addition, following preliminary experiments, an experimental program was set up at the Danish Research Center for Magnetic Resonance in Copenhagen in 2021.

Decision theory 
In ergodicity economics, the emphasis is on what happens to an agent's wealth  over time . It postulates that agents' decisions maximize the time-average growth rate of wealth. The functional form of the growth rate, depends on the wealth process . In general, a growth rate takes the form , where the function   linearizes , such that growth rates evaluated at different times can be meaningfully compared.

Growth processes  generally violate ergodicity, but their growth rates may nonetheless be ergodic.

 . (1)

Relation to classic decision theory 
The basic model in economic decision-making is expected utility theory. According to this model, agents evaluate monetary wealth  according to a utility function . It is postulated that decisions maximize the expected value of the change in utility,

 . (2)

The utility function is viewed as encoding the agent's idiosyncratic aversion to risk which, under the standard assumption is stable in time and independent of exogenous factors.

Division by  simply implements a preference for faster utility growth in the expected-utility-theory decision protocol. 
This mapping shows that the two frameworks will yield identical predictions if the utility function applied under expected-utility theory is the same as the linearization needed to compute an ergodic growth rate.

The conceptual difference is this: ergodicity economics emphasizes the dynamic circumstances under which a decision is made, whereas expected-utility theory emphasizes idiosyncratic preferences to explain behavior.

Example: Geometric Brownian motion 
A simple example for an agent's wealth process, is geometric Brownian motion (GBM), commonly used in mathematical finance and other fields.

 is said to follow GBM if it satisfies the stochastic differential equation

 , (3)

Solving (3) gives

 . (4)

Following the recipe laid out above, this leads to the time-average growth rate

 . (5)

It follows that for geometric Brownian motion,  maximizing the rate of change in the logarithmic utility function, is equivalent to maximizing the time-average growth rate of wealth, i.e. what happens to the agent's wealth over time.

Coverage in the wider media 
In December 2020, Bloomberg news published an article titled "Everything We’ve Learned About Modern Economic Theory Is Wrong" discussing the implications of ergodicity in economics following the publication of a review of the subject in Nature Physics. Morningstar covered the story to discuss the investment case for stock diversification.

In the book Skin in the Game, Nassim Nicholas Taleb suggests that the ergodicity problem requires a rethinking of how economists use probabilities. A summary of the arguments was published by Taleb in a Medium article in August 2017.

Criticisms 
The approach and relevance of the ergodicity economics research program has been criticised significantly by mainstream economists. They argue that the program misstates the content and predictions of mainstream economic theory in criticizing it, and that the basic ergodicity economics model makes obviously false predictions about behavior. An experiment carried out by neuroscientists in Denmark which "would corroborate ergodicity economics and falsify expected utility theory" has also been particularly criticised for its methods and for overstating its results.

See also
Santa Fe Institute
St. Petersburg paradox

References

Paradoxes in economics
Behavioral finance
Mathematical economics
Coin flipping
Economic theories